Frank Fulton Ross (December 2, 1867 – January 29, 1936) was a United States Army soldier received the Medal of Honor for actions on May 16, 1899, during the Philippine–American War. He was part of Young's Scouts and won the Medal along with 16 fellow Scouts.

Private Ross is buried in Bellview Cemetery, Ontario, California.

He was the son of American Civil War General Leonard Fulton Ross.

Medal of Honor citation
Rank and Organization: Private, Company H, 1st North Dakota Volunteer Infantry. Place and Date: Near San Isidro, Philippine Islands May 16, 1899. Entered Service At: Langdon, N. Dak. Birth: Avon, Avon, Ill. Date of Issue: June 6, 1906.

Citation:

With 21 other scouts charged across a burning bridge, under heavy fire, and completely routed 600 of the enemy who were entrenched in a strongly fortified position.

See also

 List of Medal of Honor recipients

References

1867 births
1936 deaths
United States Army Medal of Honor recipients
People from Avon, Illinois
People from Cavalier County, North Dakota
People from Ontario, California
American military personnel of the Philippine–American War
United States Army soldiers
Philippine–American War recipients of the Medal of Honor